Sunrise is the first studio album by South Korean rock band Day6. It was released by JYP Entertainment on June 7, 2017. This album features 14 tracks which consists of all 10 tracks that were previously released from January to May 2017 through Every Day6, tracks from Every Day6 June, rebooted version of "Letting Go", and final version of "Congratulations".

Track listing

Charts

Accolades

Sales

Release history

References

External links 

JYP Entertainment albums
Korean-language albums
2017 debut albums
Genie Music albums
Day6 albums